The 22nd Game Developers Choice Awards was an annual ceremony by Game Developers Choice Awards for outstanding game developers and video games which was held on March 23, 2022. The awards ceremony will be held alongside the Independent Games Festival awards.

Winners and Nominees
Nominees were announced on January 11, 2022.

Game of the Year
 Inscryption (Daniel Mullins Games/Devolver Digital)
 Deathloop (Arkane Studios/Bethesda Softworks)
 Forza Horizon 5 (Playground Games/Xbox Game Studios)
 It Takes Two (Hazelight Studios/Electronic Arts)
 Resident Evil Village (Capcom)

Best Audio
 Unpacking (Witch Beam /Humble Bundle)
 Deathloop (Arkane Studios/Bethesda Softworks)
 Forza Horizon 5 (Playground Games/Xbox Game Studios)
 Marvel's Guardians of the Galaxy (Eidos-Montréal/Square Enix)
 Returnal (Housemarque/Sony Interactive Entertainment)

Best Debut
 Valheim (Iron Gate Studio/Coffee Stain Publishing)
 The Artful Escape (Beethoven & Dinosaur/Annapurna Interactive)
 Kena: Bridge of Spirits (Ember Lab)
 Sable (Shedworks/Raw Fury)
 Wildermyth (Worldwalker Games/WhisperGames)

Best Design
 Inscryption (Daniel Mullins Games/Devolver Digital)
 Deathloop (Arkane Studios/Bethesda Softworks)
 Halo Infinite (343 Industries/Xbox Game Studios)
 It Takes Two (Hazelight Studios/Electronic Arts)
 Psychonauts 2 (Double Fine/Xbox Game Studios)

Innovation Award
 Inscryption (Daniel Mullins Games/Devolver Digital)
 Deathloop (Arkane Studios/Bethesda Softworks)
 It Takes Two (Hazelight Studios/Electronic Arts)
 Unpacking (Witch Beam /Humble Bundle)
 Wildermyth (Worldwalker Games/WhisperGames)

Best Narrative
 Psychonauts 2 (Double Fine/Xbox Game Studios)
 Deathloop (Arkane Studios/Bethesda Softworks)
 It Takes Two (Hazelight Studios/Electronic Arts)
 Marvel's Guardians of the Galaxy (Eidos-Montréal/Square Enix)
 Unpacking (Witch Beam /Humble Bundle)

Best Technology
 Ratchet & Clank: Rift Apart (Insomniac Games/Sony Interactive Entertainment)
 Forza Horizon 5 (Playground Games/Xbox Game Studios)
 Halo Infinite (343 Industries/Xbox Game Studios)
 Hitman 3 (IO Interactive)
 Returnal (Housemarque/Sony Interactive Entertainment)

Best Visual Art
 Ratchet & Clank: Rift Apart (Insomniac Games/Sony Interactive Entertainment)
 Deathloop (Arkane Studios/Bethesda Softworks)
 Forza Horizon 5 (Playground Games/Xbox Game Studios)
 Kena: Bridge of Spirits (Ember Lab)
 Psychonauts 2 (Double Fine/Xbox Game Studios)

Social Impact Award
 Boyfriend Dungeon (Kitfox Games)
 Before Your Eyes (GoodbyeWorld Games/Skybound Games)
 Chicory: A Colorful Tale (The Chicory: A Colorful Tale Team/Finji)
 It Takes Two (Hazelight Studios/Electronic Arts)
 Life Is Strange: True Colors (Deck Nine/Square Enix)

Audience Award
 Mini Motorways (Dinosaur Polo Club)

Lifetime Achievement Award
Yuji Horii, creator of the Dragon Quest series

Ambassador Award
Steven Spohn, founder of AbleGamers

External links
Official website

References

2021 video game awards
2022 awards in the United States
2022 in video gaming
Game Developers Choice Awards ceremonies